A kipper is a whole herring, a small, oily fish, that has been split in a butterfly fashion from tail to head along the dorsal ridge, gutted, salted or pickled, and cold-smoked over smouldering wood chips (typically oak).

In the United Kingdom, Republic of Ireland and some regions of North America, kippers are most commonly eaten for breakfast. In the United Kingdom, kippers, along with other preserved smoked or salted fish such as the bloater and buckling, were also once commonly enjoyed as a high tea or supper treat, most popularly with inland and urban working-class populations before World War II.

Terminology
The English philologist and ethnographer Walter William Skeat derives the word from the Old English kippian, to spawn. The word has various possible parallels, such as Icelandic kippa which means "to pull, snatch" and the Germanic word kippen which means "to tilt, to incline". Similarly, the Middle English kipe denotes a basket used to catch fish. Another theory traces the word kipper to the kip, or small beak, that male salmon develop during the breeding season.

As a verb, kippering ("to kipper") means to preserve by rubbing with salt or other spices before drying in the open air or in smoke. 
Originally applied to the preservation of surplus fish (particularly those known as "kips," harvested during spawning runs), kippering has come to mean the preservation of any fish, poultry, beef or other meat in like manner. The process is usually enhanced by cleaning, filleting, butterflying or slicing the food to expose maximum surface area to the drying and preservative agents.

Bucklings, bloaters and kippers
All three are types of smoked herring. Buckling is hot-smoked whole; bloaters are cold-smoked whole; kippers are split and gutted, and then cold-smoked.

Origin 

Although the exact origin of the kipper is unknown, this process of slitting, gutting, and smoke-curing fish is well documented. According to Mark Kurlansky, "Smoked foods almost always carry with them legends about their having been created by accident—usually the peasant hung the food too close to the fire, and then, imagine his surprise the next morning when …". For instance Thomas Nashe wrote in 1599 about a fisherman from Lothingland in the Great Yarmouth area who discovered smoking herring by accident. Another story of the accidental invention of kipper is set in 1843, with John Woodger of Seahouses in Northumberland, when fish for processing was left overnight in a room with a smoking stove. These stories and others are known to be untrue because the word "kipper" long predates this. Smoking and salting of fish—in particular of spawning salmon and herring—which are caught in large numbers in a short time and can be made suitable for edible storage by this practice predates 19th-century Britain and indeed written history, probably going back as long as humans have been using salt to preserve food.

Colouring

A kipper is also sometimes referred to as a red herring, although particularly strong curing is required to produce a truly red kipper.
The term appears in a mid-13th century poem by the Anglo-Norman poet Walter of Bibbesworth, "He eteþ no ffyssh But heryng red." Samuel Pepys used it in his diary entry of 28 February 1660: "Up in the morning, and had some red herrings to our breakfast, while my boot-heel was a-mending, by the same token the boy left the hole as big as it was before."

The dyeing of kippers was introduced as an economy measure in the First World War by avoiding the need for the long smoking processes.  This allowed the kippers to be sold quickly, easily and for a substantially greater profit.  Kippers were originally dyed using a coal tar dye called brown FK (the FK is an abbreviation of "for kippers"), kipper brown or kipper dye. Today, kippers are usually brine-dyed using a natural annatto dye, giving the fish a deeper orange/yellow colour.  European Community legislation limits the acceptable daily intake (ADI) of Brown FK to 0.15 mg/kg. Not all fish caught are suitable for the dyeing process, with mature fish more readily sought, because the density of their flesh improves the absorption of the dye. An orange kipper is a kipper that has been dyed orange.

Kippers from the Isle of Man and some Scottish producers are not dyed; the smoking time is extended in the traditional manner.

Preparation

"Cold-smoked" fish that have not been salted for preservation must be cooked before being eaten safely (they can be boiled, fried, grilled, jugged or roasted, for instance). "Kipper snacks" (see below) are precooked and may be eaten without further preparation. In general, oily fish are preferred for smoking as the heat is evenly dispersed by the oil, and the flesh resists flaking apart like drier species.

In the United Kingdom, kippers are often served for breakfast, and much less often at lunch or dinner. In the United States, where kippers are much less commonly eaten than in the UK, they are almost always sold as either canned "kipper snacks" or in jars found in the refrigerated foods section.

Kippers industry
Kippers produced in the Isle of Man are exported around the world. Thousands are produced annually in the town of Peel, where two kipper houses, Moore's Kipper Yard (founded 1882) and Devereau and Son (founded 1884), smoke and export herring.

Mallaig, once the busiest herring port in Europe, is famous for its traditionally smoked kippers, as well as Stornoway kippers and Loch Fyne kippers. The harbour village of Craster in Northumberland is famed for Craster kippers, which are prepared in a local smokehouse, sold in the village shop and exported around the world.

Related terms

Kipper time is the season in which fishing for salmon in the River Thames in the United Kingdom is forbidden by an Act of Parliament; this period was originally the period 3 May to 6 January but has changed since. Kipper season refers (particularly among fairground workers, market workers, taxi drivers and the like) to any lean period in trade, particularly the first three or four months of the year.

The sailors of the Royal Canadian Navy use the term kippers as a slang for members of the Royal Navy.

The term kippering is used in slang to mean being immersed in a room filled with cigarette or other tobacco smoke.

The English (UK) idiom [to be] 'stitched (or 'done') up like a kipper' is commonly used to describe a situation where a person has (depending on context) been 'fitted up' or 'framed'; 'used', unfairly treated or betrayed; or cheated out of something, with no possibility of correcting the 'wrong' done.

In the children's books The Railway Series, and in the television show Thomas the Tank Engine and Friends, The Flying Kipper is a nickname for a fast fish train usually pulled by Henry the Green Engine.

The United States Department of Agriculture defines "Kippered Beef" as a cured dry product similar to beef jerky but not as dry.

See also

 Fish preservation
 Herring as food
 Kipper tie
 List of dried foods
 List of smoked foods
 Red herring, an irrelevant distraction
 Smoked fish
 Solomon Gundy

Notes

References

Further reading
 Bannerman, A. McK. (2001) Kippers Torry Advisory Note No. 48, FAO, Rome.

External links 

 "The lure of red herring", history of smoked fish varieties.
 Isle of Man Kipper Museum
 National Library of Scotland: SCOTTISH SCREEN ARCHIVE (archive films relating to the production of kippers)
E154 Brown FK 
Nicky Duffy, Guardian Unlimited
 Kippers, the breakfast dish that fell out of favour, are back on British menus The Guardian, 7 April 2012.	

Japanese cuisine
Dried fish
Food preservation
Fish processing
Manx cuisine
Oily fish
Smoked fish
Animal-based seafood
British seafood dishes
Breakfast
Irish cuisine
North American cuisine